Pryvit (Welcome) is a Ukrainian dance developed by 20th century Ukrainian performance ensembles to start off programs of Ukrainian folk dances. In it, the dancers preview dances and the various representations or regional folk costumes which will be seen later in the performance. At some point in the dance, the audience is welcomed by one or more dancers bearing wheat, bread and (sometimes visible, but always implied) salt. It is performed by amateurs and professional Ukrainian dance ensembles as well as other performers of folk dance.

The bread, salt and wheat represent the land's fertility to Ukrainian people.

See also 
 Bread and salt

Ukrainian dances
Greetings